This is a list of television programs broadcast by Albanian TV channel Top Channel. The channel was launched on December 20, 2001.

Top Channel's programmes include a broad range of mostly pre-recorded shows, news editions, social and economic programs and entertainments (movies, sports, etc.). Scheduled domestic and foreign programming includes:

Nationally created TV shows broadcast by Top Channel

International TV shows broadcast by Top Channel

External links

Official website

Lists of television series by network
Television in Albania